Horsea may refer to:
Horsea Island, an island in Portsmouth Harbour, England
Horsea (Pokémon), a Pokémon species